Sycozoa seiziwadai is a species of is a sea squirt in the family Holozoidae, first described by Takasi Tokioka in 1952.

Description 
Sycozoa seiziwadai consists of a colony of colourless zooids  in paired vertical rows with the cloaca at the distal end of each pair.

Range and Habitat
It is found in coastal waters from Queensland, the Northern Territoryto Western Australia, and off the Philippines., in subtidal waters

Etymology
The species epithet, seiziwadai, honours  Seizi Wada, the  collector of the type specimen in the Arafura Sea.

References

External links
Sycozoa seiziwadai Tokioka, 1952: Occurrence data from GBIF

Tunicates